EZ-Poly is a brand of multipurpose polyurethane filler adhesive sealant originally branded as RayCrete. EZ-Poly is a structural filler so it can do more than just cosmetic repairs like products such as Bondo.  It is versatile enough to eliminate the need for multiple products. It can be used for indoor, outdoor, and many underwater purposes and is environmentally safe.

EZ-Poly is a two-part compound. 

The product experiences minor expansion while curing depending on moisture level but does not shrink. It will bond dissimilar materials and fill both minor and major gaps. It does not have problems posed by epoxies because it has no odor, no VOCs, does not get hot during cure and is not flammable. EZ-Poly is good to use with concrete, wood, stone and other porous materials and can be used with etched plastics, metals and glass. The product is waterproof and weatherproof. It can be painted with plastic-compatible paint and is best used with a shellac primer.

The product can be worked during cure as it becomes clay-like and once cured can be sanded, sawed, planed, lathed, screwed, nailed and machined.

RayCrete and EZ-Poly were manufactured by Valiant Technologies, Inc. and sold throughout the world from 1996 to 2008. Valiant Technologies closed in 2008, and while you can still find references to its products on the Internet, they are no longer available.

Adhesives
Brand name materials